The Acworth Downtown Historic District, in Acworth, Georgia, is a historic district roughly bounded by Southside Dr., Federal and Lemon Sts, and Senator Richard B. Russell Ave.

It is a linear district along Main Street and the CSX railway tracks.

References

Historic districts on the National Register of Historic Places in Georgia (U.S. state)
National Register of Historic Places in Cobb County, Georgia
Early Commercial architecture in the United States
International style architecture in Georgia (U.S. state)
Buildings and structures completed in 1842
1842 establishments in Georgia (U.S. state)